Nepenthes longiptera is a tropical pitcher plant endemic to the province of Aceh in the island of Sumatra in Indonesia. Nepenthes longiptera differs from all other Nepenthes species from Sumatra by the presence of wings on its upper pitchers. Morphologically, this species closely resembled N. tobaica, but differs on its much larger habit, the well-developed wings of its upper pitchers, the rhomboid-shaped cross-section of the stem, and the presence of appendage under the lid.

The presence of putative hybrid with sympatric species was also recorded.

References

Carnivorous plants of Asia
longiptera
Plants described in 2021